The Duplass brothers are:

 Mark Duplass (born 1976), American filmmaker, actor, writer, and musician
 Jay Duplass (born 1973), American film director, author, and actor

See also
 Duplass Brothers Productions, their production company

Sibling duos